Arvis Piziks (born 12 September 1969) is a Latvian former professional road bicycle racer. He won the National Road Race Championships in 2000. He rode at three Olympic Games.

Major results

1989
 2nd Overall FBD Insurance Rás
1991
 1st Stage 4 Tour de Liège
 2nd Overall Circuit du Hainut
1st Stage 3
1992
 1st  Overall Cinturón a Mallorca
1st Stage 2
 1st Stage 2 Tour of Sweden
 1st Paris–Tours Espoirs
 8th Road race, Summer Olympics
1993
 1st Lancaster Classic
 1st Prologue & Stage 1b Grand Prix Guillaume Tell
 5th Amateur road race, World Road Championships
1994
 1st  Overall Grand Prix François-Faber
1st Stage 2
 1st Internatie Reningelst
 1st Stage 7b Tour de Normandie
 2nd Overall Circuit Franco Belge
1st Stages 4 & 6
 3rd Overall Tour of Sweden
1st Stage 4
 3rd Kattekoers
1995
 2nd Grand Prix of Aargau Canton
 2nd Druivenkoers Overijse
 3rd De Kustpijl
 10th Grand Prix de Plouay
1996
 1st Stage 4 Tour du Limousin
 1st Stage 1 Tour DuPont
 1st Stages 2 & 5 Herald Sun Tour
 2nd Veenendaal–Veenendaal
1997
 3rd National Time Trial Championships
 3rd Veenendaal–Veenendaal
1998
 1st Stage 2A Herald Sun Tour
 1st Stage 5 3-Länder-Tour
 2nd National Road Race Championships
 3rd National Time Trial Championships
 4th Omloop Mandel-Leie-Schelde
 6th GP Arhus
 7th Omloop Het Volk
 8th GP Midtbank
 10th Veenendaal–Veenendaal
1999
 2nd GP Midtbank
 2nd Kampioenschap van Vlaanderen
 3rd National Time Trial Championships
 4th National Road Race Championships
 4th Grote Prijs Jef Scherens
 6th Paris–Bruxelles
 8th Kuurne–Brussels–Kuurne
 8th GP Arhus
2000
 1st  National Road Race Championships
 1st GP Arhus
 1st Stage 1 Four Days of Dunkirk
 10th Grote Prijs Jef Scherens
2001
 2nd National Time Trial Championships
 2nd GP Herning
 2nd Overall Tour de Picardie
 2nd First Union Classic
 3rd GP Arhus
 3rd Dwars door Vlaanderen
 4th Gent–Wevelgem
2002
 2nd National Road Race Championships
 2nd National Time Trial Championships

Grand Tour results

References

External links
 
 
 

1969 births
Living people
Latvian male cyclists
Olympic cyclists of Latvia
Cyclists at the 1992 Summer Olympics
Cyclists at the 1996 Summer Olympics
Cyclists at the 2000 Summer Olympics
People from Gulbene